The Great Western Divide is a Sierra Nevada mountain range that forms part of the border between the Kings Canyon and Sequoia National Parks. The High Sierra Trail crosses the range at Kaweah Gap from Sequoia National Park.

The divide separates the watersheds of the Kaweah, Kern and Kings rivers. The divide includes the Kaweah Peaks Ridge.

List of peaks 

 Black Kaweah
 Mount Brewer
 North Guard
 South Guard
 Mount Farquhar
 Mount Kaweah
 Red Kaweah
 Kaweah Queen
 Milestone Mountain
 Midway Mountain
 Triple Divide Peak
 Lippincott Mountain
 Lion Rock
 Mount Eisen

References 

Kings Canyon National Park
Mountain ranges of Northern California
Mountain ranges of the Sierra Nevada (United States)
Sequoia National Park
Mountain ranges of Tulare County, California